Gabriel Iván Heinze (born 19 April 1978) is an Argentine football coach and former player who is currently the manager of Newell's Old Boys. As a player, he operated as a defender, either as a left-back or a centre-back.

Nicknamed Gringo ("Foreigner" in Argentine–Spanish slang), he made a name for himself at Paris Saint-Germain, moving in 2004 to Manchester United and subsequently to Real Madrid, winning three trophies in total with the latter two clubs. He started and finished his 18-year professional career with Newell's Old Boys.

Heinze played 72 times for the Argentina national team, including at two FIFA World Cup and two Copa América tournaments. In 2015, he began working as a manager, leading four teams in the Argentine Primera División.

Club career

Early career
Heinze was born in Crespo, Entre Ríos to a father of Volga German descent and a mother of Sicilian descent, thus also holding an Italian and a German passport. He began his career in his home country with Newell's Old Boys and, following attention from various European clubs, the 19-year-old signed for Real Valladolid in Spain, not managing one single La Liga appearance in his first season and also being loaned to Sporting CP in December 1998.

After the 2000–01 campaign, where he appeared in 36 league games to help the Castile and León side narrowly avoid top flight relegation, Heinze moved to Paris Saint-Germain, where he amassed over 100 overall appearances in three years, helping to the 2004 conquest of the Coupe de France.

Manchester United
In June 2004, Heinze joined Manchester United for a fee of £6.9 million. He marked his debut on 11 September with a goal in a 2–2 away draw against Bolton Wanderers, and immediately established himself as first-choice left-back, being regularly lauded by fans with the chant of "Ar-gen-tina!" and eventually voted the club's best player for the 2004–05 season.

On 14 September 2005, Heinze was injured in a UEFA Champions League match with Villarreal and was ruled out of first-team action for the rest of the campaign. Previously, he had scored two goals in the same competition, the 3–0 second-leg qualifier away win over Debreceni. He made a comeback with the reserve team in April 2006, but a minor injury picked up in his third game back prevented him from making a first-team appearance before the end of the season. The consequence of this injury was the signing of Patrice Evra, who went on to become the club's first-choice left-back in the following years.

Heinze returned to action for United in 2006–07, and eventually won a place in the side back as a central defender, due to an injury crisis. After the team had sealed the Premier League title, he was named captain for the last two games of the season, away to Chelsea and at home to West Ham United.

After becoming disillusioned with manager Alex Ferguson by his lack of regular first-team action, Heinze demanded a transfer to Liverpool during the close season. United rejected the bid, believed to be in the region of £6.8 million.

Real Madrid

On 22 August 2007, Heinze joined Real Madrid on a four-year deal, becoming the third United player to join the Spaniards (after David Beckham and Ruud van Nistelrooy), for a reported £8 million fee. He made his debut on 2 September against Villarreal, coming on as a substitute for Raúl. On 30 March 2008 he netted his first goal for the Merengues, in a 3–1 home win over Sevilla, and finished his debut season with 20 appearances to help win the league.

Heinze was more regularly used in his second year at the Santiago Bernabéu Stadium, but the club came out empty in silverware, with the exception of that year's Supercopa de España.

Marseille

On 30 July 2009, Heinze joined Marseille on a two-year deal for an undisclosed fee, reuniting at the Ligue 1 club with countryman Lucho González. In his first year he scored a career-best four league goals in 27 matches, as L'OM won both the national championship and the season's Coupe de la Ligue. On 27 March 2010 he was a starter as his team defeated Bordeaux in the latter competition's final, for Marseille's first major title since 1993; on 5 May, he netted the opener in a 3–1 home win against Rennes, which clinched the league. Manager Didier Deschamps later described the season's events as an "extraordinary human adventure".

Heinze was again a defensive stalwart in the 2010–11 season. On 20 March 2011, he scored from a free kick to help defeat his former club PSG 2–1 at home in the Clasico.

On 1 June 2011, it was announced on Marseille's website that 33-year-old Heinze would leave the club at the end of the season.

Later years
Heinze joined Serie A side A.S. Roma on 22 July 2011, after being released by Marseille at the end of June. He made his competitive debut on 11 September, in a 1–2 home loss against Cagliari.

On 19 March 2012, after appearing in his 25th official game, Heinze had his contract automatically renewed for another year. However, just five months later, it was announced on Roma's official website that he was being released from his contract with immediate effect; the day after his release he joined his original club, Newell's Old Boys, on a two-year deal.

International career 
Heinze first represented Argentina on 30 April 2003, in a friendly away win with Libya. The following year, he was selected as one of the three overage players then Argentina U23 won the gold medal at the 2004 Summer Olympics. He scored in a 6–0 win over Serbia and Montenegro in the group stage.

Despite missing most of 2005–06 with Manchester United due to injury, Heinze was called up for the 2006 FIFA World Cup finals in Germany. In the quarter-final clash against the hosts, he started as Argentina lost on penalties.

Heinze participated in the 2007 Copa América, scoring with his head from a Juan Román Riquelme free kick in the semi-finals against Mexico, a 3–0 win for the eventual runners-up. In the 2010 FIFA World Cup he played in four of Argentina's five matches in South Africa, netting the game's only goal – his third international – in a group stage victory over Nigeria.

Coaching career

Early years
Even though he still did not possess the proper license, Heinze began working as a manager in June 2015, being appointed at Godoy Cruz in the Argentine Primera División. On 12 July, he won 3–0 at home to Crucero del Norte on his debut. He was sacked on 27 September, following two wins, two draws and six defeats.

Heinze signed at Argentinos Juniors in June 2016. In July of the following year, after achieving top-level promotion, he resigned. 

On 11 December 2017, Heinze was appointed at Vélez Sarsfield. Having led the team to two consecutive Copa Sudamericana qualifications, he chose not to continue past the end of the 2019–20 season.

Atlanta United
On 18 December 2020, Heinze was named manager of Major League Soccer club Atlanta United on a two-year contract. On his debut the following 6 April, the side won by one goal away to Alajuelense of Costa Rica, in the last-16 first leg of the CONCACAF Champions League.

Heinze banished Atlanta's star striker Josef Martínez from training, and publicly said that this was his own decision, rather than a precaution based on the Venezuelan's COVID-19 diagnosis at the 2021 Copa América. On 18 July that year, having won just twice in 13 games, he was dismissed from his job.

Newell's Old Boys
On 25 October 2022, Heinze was hired by Newell's, having rejected an offer from the club the previous December.

Personal life
Heinze was named in the Panama Papers, a 2016 leak of offshore accounts used for tax evasion. In 2005, he signed an endorsement with Puma AG in which at least a million dollars was paid to him over a period of five years through an account in his mother's name in the British Virgin Islands.

An urban myth, published in sources including UEFA's website, alleged that Heinze was a member of Y Wladfa, the Welsh-speaking colony in Patagonia. This was proven false by a Manchester United spokeswoman.

Career statistics

Club
Source:

International
Appearances and goals by national team and year

International goals
|-
| 1 || 17 August 2005 || Ferenc Puskás, Budapest, Hungary ||  || 1–2 || 1–2 || Friendly||
|-
| 2 || 11 July 2007 || Polideportivo Cachamay, Puerto Ordaz, Venezuela ||  || 0–1 || 0–3 || 2007 Copa América||
|-
| 3 || 12 June 2010 || Ellis Park, Johannesburg, South Africa ||  || 1–0 || 1–0 || 2010 FIFA World Cup||
|}

Managerial statistics

Honours

Player

Paris Saint-Germain
UEFA Intertoto Cup: 2001

Manchester United
Premier League: 2006–07

Real Madrid
La Liga: 2007–08
Supercopa de España: 2008

Marseille
Ligue 1: 2009–10
Coupe de la Ligue: 2009–10, 2010–11

Newell's Old Boys
Argentine Primera División: 2013 Final

Argentina U23
Summer Olympic Games: 2004

Argentina
Copa América runner-up: 2004, 2007
FIFA Confederations Cup runner-up: 2005

Individual
Sir Matt Busby Player of the Year: 2004–05

Manager
Argentinos Juniors
Primera B Nacional: 2016–17

References

External links

 
 
 
 
 Official website

1978 births
Living people
Argentine people of Italian descent
Argentine people of Sicilian descent
Argentine people of Volga German descent
Citizens of Germany through descent
Citizens of Italy through descent
Sportspeople from Entre Ríos Province
Argentine footballers
Association football defenders
Argentine Primera División players
Newell's Old Boys footballers
La Liga players
Real Valladolid players
Real Madrid CF players
Primeira Liga players
Sporting CP footballers
Ligue 1 players
Paris Saint-Germain F.C. players
Olympique de Marseille players
Premier League players
Manchester United F.C. players
FA Cup Final players
Serie A players
A.S. Roma players
Argentina international footballers
2004 Copa América players
2005 FIFA Confederations Cup players
2006 FIFA World Cup players
2007 Copa América players
2010 FIFA World Cup players
Olympic footballers of Argentina
Footballers at the 2004 Summer Olympics
Olympic medalists in football
Medalists at the 2004 Summer Olympics
Olympic gold medalists for Argentina
Argentine expatriate footballers
Argentine expatriate sportspeople in Spain
Argentine expatriate sportspeople in Portugal
Argentine expatriate sportspeople in France
Argentine expatriate sportspeople in England
Argentine expatriate sportspeople in Italy
Expatriate footballers in Spain
Expatriate footballers in Portugal
Expatriate footballers in France
Expatriate footballers in England
Expatriate footballers in Italy
Argentine football managers
Argentine Primera División managers
Godoy Cruz Antonio Tomba managers
Argentinos Juniors managers
Club Atlético Vélez Sarsfield managers
Newell's Old Boys managers
Major League Soccer coaches
Atlanta United FC coaches
Argentine expatriate football managers
Expatriate soccer managers in the United States
Argentine expatriate sportspeople in the United States
People named in the Panama Papers